Mary Willing Byrd (September 10, 1740 – March 1814) was an American planter.

She was the second wife of Colonel William Byrd III, a Colonial American military officer at the time of the American Revolution and son of the founder of Richmond, Virginia. Her father, Charles Willing, was the mayor of Philadelphia from 1748 to 1754, and her great-grandfather, Edward Shippen, was the second mayor of Philadelphia, from 1701 to 1703.

Her husband committed suicide in January 1777, leaving considerable debts. She managed his plantations, including Westover Plantation, in Charles City County, in order to satisfy his creditors and still preserve some property for their ten children to inherit. She sold off some western lands, residences in Richmond and Williamsburg, and other property, but she was able to retain control of Westover, the major Byrd plantation in Charles City County.

Although Byrd had many ties to the British and Loyalists during the American Revolution, she tried to remain neutral. After trying to recover property that had been seized by the British, she was charged in 1781 by the state of Virginia with trading with the enemy. Byrd defended herself eloquently in a letter to Governor Thomas Jefferson: "I wish well to all mankind, to America in particular. What am I but an American? All my friends and connexions are in America; my whole property is here—could I wish ill to everything I have an interest in?" Her trial was first postponed and ultimately never held.

In 2007 Byrd was posthumously honored by the Library of Virginia's "Virginia Women in History" program.

Children
Mary Willing Byrd had ten children:
Maria Horsmanden Byrd
Evelyn Taylor Byrd
Charles Willing Byrd (died as child)
Abby Byrd
Anne Willing Byrd
William Boyd Byrd
Charles Willing Byrd
Dorothy Byrd (died as child)
Jane Byrd 
Richard Willing Byrd.

Further reading
John T. Kneebone et al., eds., Dictionary of Virginia Biography (Richmond: Library of Virginia, 1998-   ), 2:457-459. .

References

External links
Westover Plantation

Sale of property by Mary Willing Byrd
Thomas Jefferson, letter to Mary Willing Byrd, October 24, 1779
Mary Willing Byrd, portrait by John Wollaston

1740 births
1814 deaths
Shippen family
American planters
American slave owners
People of Virginia in the American Revolution
People from Charles City County, Virginia
Artists from Philadelphia
Women in the American Revolution
Mary Willing Byrd
American people of English descent
Burials in Virginia